The Inner Me may refer to:
 The Inner Me (Ashley Wallbridge album)
 The Inner Me (Lala Hsu album)